Granada Mall is a shopping mall located in the eastern ring road highway (airport direction) between exit 8-9 Ghernata District in Riyadh, Saudi Arabia. As of 2012, the centre housed 235 shops.

It was built by Saudi Constructioneers (SAUDICO).

See also
 List of shopping malls in Saudi Arabia

References

Granada Mall

External links
Official website

Shopping malls in Saudi Arabia
Buildings and structures in Riyadh
Tourist attractions in Riyadh